Nakhon Chum railway station is a railway station in Nakhon Chum Sub-district, Ban Pong District, Ratchaburi. It is a class 3 railway station  from Thon Buri railway station. Nakhon Chum Station is one of the stations where the main station building is on the passing loop.

Train services 
 Ordinary 251/252 Bang Sue Junction-Prachuap Khiri Khan-Bang Sue Junction
 Ordinary 254 Lang Suan-Thon Buri
 Ordinary 261/262 Bangkok-Hua Hin-Bangkok
 Ordinary 351/352 Thon Buri-Ratchaburi-Thon Buri

References

External links
 
 

Railway stations in Thailand